Bart Swings (born 12 February 1991) is a Belgian long track speed skater and inline speed skater. He is the 2022 Olympic champion on the speed skating mass start. Swings won Belgium's first gold medal in 74 years and is the first Belgian athlete ever to have won two medals in the Winter Olympics.

Career
At his first world championship speed skating event, the 2011 World Single Distance Speed Skating Championships in Inzell, Germany, he finished 17th in the 5000 m.

At the 2012 World Allround Speed Skating Championships in Moscow, he finished 9th overall, with a personal record at the 500 m and a national record at the 1500 m.

At the 2013 World Allround Speed Skating Championships in Hamar, he finished 3rd overall and took the Bronze medal back home to Belgium.

At the 2018 Winter Olympics in Pyeongchang, he won a silver medal in the 1st ever Mass start at the Winter Olympics. Four years later, he won the gold medal in this event. It was Belgium's second-ever gold medal in the Winter Olympics history and the first for an individual male athlete.

At the 2019 World Single Distances Speed Skating Championships, he took the lead in the men's mass start but crashed on the final lap, costing him the podium.

At the 2021 World Single Distances Speed Skating Championships, he won bronze in the men's mass start, winning his first-ever medal in a World Single Distances Speed Skating Championship event.

At the 2022 Berlin Marathon, he crossed the finish line in 56:45 minutes and set a new course record. At the same time, he secured his eighth victory at the BMW BERLIN-MARATHON inline skating.

At the World Games, he won seven medals, including four gold. He won two gold, one silver and one bronze at The World Games 2013 in Cali, Colombia and two gold and one silver at the World Games 2017 in Wroclaw, Poland.

Swings is currently studying for an engineer's degree at the Katholieke Universiteit Leuven.

His brother Maarten Swings also competes in inline speed skating and speed skating, participating in the inline skating world championships and qualifying for the ISU Speed Skating World Cup.

Personal records

As of 23 November 2015, his highest ranking on the all-time Adelskalender is 11th.

References

External links
 
 
 
  (archive)
 

1991 births
Belgian roller skaters
Belgian male speed skaters
Inline speed skaters
Speed skaters at the 2014 Winter Olympics
Speed skaters at the 2018 Winter Olympics
Speed skaters at the 2022 Winter Olympics
Olympic speed skaters of Belgium
World Games gold medalists
World Games silver medalists
World Games bronze medalists
People from Herent
Living people
Competitors at the 2013 World Games
Competitors at the 2017 World Games
Competitors at the 2022 World Games
Medalists at the 2018 Winter Olympics
Medalists at the 2022 Winter Olympics
Olympic medalists in speed skating
Olympic gold medalists for Belgium
Olympic silver medalists for Belgium
World Allround Speed Skating Championships medalists
World Single Distances Speed Skating Championships medalists
Sportspeople from Flemish Brabant
21st-century Belgian people